A.T.O.M. is an English-language French action animated series created by Ariane Desrieux and Paul-Patrick Duval. The show takes place in the fictional Landmark City and focuses on five teenagers, the eponymous Alpha Teens on Machines, who are given prototype weapons, gadgets and vehicles in order to battle Alexander Paine, a man who threatens to destroy Landmark City.

Alpha Teens
The Alpha Teens are teenagers who participated in a TV contest and won. Their prize was being hired by Mr. Lee to use his prototype devices.

Axel Manning
Axel Manning (voiced by James Arnold Taylor) is the eighteen-year-old leader of A.T.O.M., and a master of the Jo-Lan martial art. Jo-Lan combines the body and mind, allowing each punch, kick, etc. to land with a burst of energy. When Axel was 8, his father, Sebastian Manning, was supposedly killed in an explosion by who was assumed to be Paine, but later found to be someone else. Axel still searches for the truth on what really happened.

Axel enjoys adventure and will push his body to its limits. Just like the rest of the team  he likes extreme sports. Possibly the team's most level-headed member, Axel feels bad when he feels he put someone in danger and for a long time, blamed himself for his father's death. He and King become close friends and he also seems to have feelings for Lioness, as she is the only one who can get through to him when he is brooding about the past or enranged with his enemies.

During Season 1, Axel hated Paine for (he first assumed) betraying and killing his father. This and Paine's attempts to take over Landmark City, lead to many battles between the two before Paine was imprisoned again. In Season 2, when Mr. Lee's true intentions were revealed, Axel felt betrayed and angrily promised that he'd do everything in his power to stop him.

Axel has brown hair and gray eyes, just like his father. His Alpha Team uniform is black and orange. His personalized equipment include the Turboboard and the Thunderbike 3000. The only other family that he mentioned were his parents, but there is little information about his mother - she and Axel moved out of their hometown after Sebastian was declared dead; she visited Axel at the Aquarium Center for Cristmas in the episode 8 of Season 1 - 'Enter the Dragon'. His catchphrases are "Gear it up!" as well as yelling out the names of his techniques, whenever he uses them.

His four main Jo-Lan based attacks are:

 Jo-Lan Choubatsu (Jo-Lan Super-strike or possibly Jo-Lan Intestine Strike), which, as the name suggests, is a strike to the gut using the energy of Jo-Lan emanating from the palms of his hands (similar to Hadouken).
 Jo-Lan Ryuuseiken (Jo-Lan Dragon Spirit Fist), a spinning uppercut (similar to Shoryuken).
 Uzumaki Jo-Lan Kick (Whirlpool Jo-Lan Kick), a spinning kick, with the number of spins varying between episodes (similar to Tatsumaki Senpuukyaku).
 Super Jo-Lan (Super Jo-Lan Choubatsu), a normal Jo-Lan choubatsu, only its power is magnified 10X times, it is a move that Axel used to devastate Pain at the end of the 1st season (similar to a Metsu Hadouken).
 Ryoku Jo-Lan – This attack quite similar to Jo-Lan Choubatsu but with more power and release more energy. Axel can also use this attack to knock himself out (see episode 22 season 1 "The Big Sleep").

King
Crey "King" Kingston (voiced by Aldis Hodge) is nineteen years old and is the oldest member of the team. He is a gentle giant with superhuman strength who is skilled in various forms of Wrestling such as Greco-Roman wrestling, submission wrestling and pro-wrestling. King can rip through doors and walls with little effort; his power equals that of Axel when Axel uses his Jo-Lan special attacks. King also is tech savvy with computers, which he has shown on more than one occasion.

His father brought him to Blue Pines National Park in the outskirts of Landmark City. The experience changed him to the King that he is now. King also loves animals except for butterflies, which he is afraid of. He would almost go postal when animals are being mistreated in any way. King also has numerous exotic pets including a cat, Sparky the gopher, Clarence the Brazilian tree frog who turned out to be female and had many babies, Benny the porcupine and Fluffy the bat. He has also temporarily housed other animals at various periods of time and loves to nurse them back to health.

King has a big appetite and eats enormous portions of food. His favorite eating establishment is "Captain Doughnut". Although he gets along pretty well with everyone on the team, Axel seems to be his closest friend. He is also the wrestling coach for the Landmark City School for the Gifted, his brother Duke's school.

In Season 1, King has battled Flesh scores of times with King being the usual victor because he's smaller, smarter and sightly faster. He also has tangled with Vinnie Rossi, once when he was human winning the WWC world title in a wrestling match. Then when he changed into Mass, he barely defeated him in a hospital.

King is bald-headed, but has a black goatee and green eyes, his Alpha Team uniform is white and orange. His personalized equipment include the Power Ram and the Thunderquad 3000. King has a big intermediate family with three brothers who in his words "eat like pigs". His catchphrase is: "Get out of my grill!".

Lioness
Catalina "Lioness" Leone (voiced by Alli Mauzey) is the youngest on the team at the age of seventeen. She is a talented Pardo-Brazilian songwriter and singer who practices capoeira. Her agility and athletic ability make her a very effective fighter. She can hold her own in battle and has exhibited more courage than the others, mainly Hawk and Shark.

Like Axel, Lioness thrives on challenge and will push her body to its limits. Lioness had two fears, Paine's powers and public speaking, both of which she eventually overcame. She grew up with four brothers, named: Alexander, Antonio, Edvardo, and Fernando. So she understands how guys think and act. Lioness' father, Rico Leone, known as Thrash, is a rockstar and comes to visit her in one episode. She has a crush on Axel and is jealous of Magness when she flirts with him. While deep down Lioness does not hate Hawk, she is probably the least tolerant of his boisterous ego. She is also part of a group of capoeira performers in her off time.

Lioness has fought and defeated Spydah on numerous occasions during Season 1. She also has developed a tense rivalry with Paine's daughter Magness because while she tried to take Team Alpha out at her father's orders by pretending to be a medical professional, Magness targeted Lioness by using her leg injury to gaslight her and diminish her abilities. Magness later infiltrates in Rico Leone's band as their manager, using touring as a cover for her stealing. Trying to kill Axel is also a reason why Lioness doesn't like Magness.

Lioness has brown hair and gold-green eyes. Her Alpha Team uniform is green and white. Her personalized equipment include the Tag Blaster and the MTX 9000. Along with her brothers, Lioness also has a cousin named Eliza, who came to visit once in the episode "Remote Control" and fancied Garrett. Her catchphrase is: "¡Vamos!".

Hawk
Zack "Hawk" Hawkes (voiced by Charlie Schlatter) is an eighteen-year-old gifted test pilot who is more at home in the air than on the ground, both due to his piloting skill and his huge ego. He is not too much of a hand-to-hand fighter. He has used a Muay Thai fighting stance more than once, getting knocked down each time he did it. He also was not able to swim until Lioness and a lifeguard named Laura taught him the basics.

Before his time with the Alpha Teens, Hawk was enrolled in a flight school where he developed a rivalry with another pilot named Bogey. They pushed each other to see who was the best pilot, but Bogey's actions almost got them both killed. Both men were expelled after Bogey put all the blame on Hawk for the incident during an inquest.

Hawk's aforementioned ego often annoys the rest of the team (and almost everybody else he meets) and sometimes is counterproductive on their missions. Because of this, he often strikes out with the ladies, including Lioness when he tried to pick her up when they first met. Despite this, Hawk is very serious about protecting innocent lives as well as his piloting skills (e.g. he refuses to evacuate a damaged aircraft unless he makes sure it lands safely).

Hawk is a serious actor, when not fighting villainy or testing vehicles for Lee Industries. His two biggest claims to fame are starring in the sci-fi b-movie, "Radioactive Island" in the first season and advertising "Worrywart" wart cream in a TV commercial in the second; the latter he is teased for. He is also becoming a good friend to Shark, despite his clean freak nature contrasting with Shark's sloppiness.

Hawk has light red hair and green eyes; his Alpha Team uniform is blue and orange. His personalized equipment includes the Jetwing and the Rotarbike 3000. Hawk has parents and possibly more family, which he describes as one being "...more superficial than the next". His catchphrases are: "Hawk flies in, he saves the day" and "Oh yeah, who rocks?!".

Shark
Ollie Herbert "Shark" Sharker (voiced by Brian Donovan) is an eighteen-year-old laid back surfer who is most at home in the water. A student of oceanography, Shark's is a great asset during water-based missions or while testing water-based vehicles for Lee Industries. Like Hawk, Shark isn't very accomplished fighter, but he is very skilled at evasion due to his knowledge of balance and the reflexes he gained from surfing. While most of the time, Shark is a calm and relaxed individual, when Axel was poisoned by Paine's men, he proved himself to be an effective leader. Throughout the series, a connection is forming between him and Hawk despite his sloppiness and Hawk's clean freak nature and huge ego. Shark has blond hair and blue eyes, his Alpha Team uniform is yellow and blue. His personalized equipment include the Scubashark and the Sharkski 3000. Shark's mother is his only reference to a family currently. His catchphrase is "Shake the sand out of your shorts, dude".

Antagonists

Paine's gang
Paine's gang is a criminal group that serves as the main antagonist of the first season.

Alexander Paine
Alexander Paine (voiced by Clancy Brown) is an evil crime boss who seeks to take over Landmark City and serves as the main antagonist of the first season. He is a former covert ops spy for the government, and worked closely with Axel Manning's father, Sebastian Manning.  When Axel recovered his father's diary, he found out that Lee was trading the government's project secrets for tons of money. Then the government reported that someone was giving the secrets to someone else. Sebastian went undercover and caught Lee. Lee told him the truth, saying that it was the owner of the "Serpent's Tail" a.k.a. Master Quan. Paine and Manning went into the nuclear room to fight him, however, Master Quan was equipped with a bomb. The bomb went off, and only Paine escaped alive albeit with his body scarred. Sebastian's body never appeared and he was labeled dead as a result. Paine was put on trial for the murder of Sebastian Manning and given life imprisonment.

He served ten years at Talon Penitentiary, Landmark City's triple-maximum security prison, before Spydah helped break him out. He ran into Sebastian Manning's 18-year-old son Axel, who sought revenge for (he first assumed) betraying and killing his father and wanted Paine back in jail. Due to a freak accident that Axel accidentally caused, Paine's nervous system was permanently damaged. Because of this, he is in constant pain, but has the ability to transfer his intense pain to whomever he touches. Controlling a group of convicts from Talon, including Spydah and Flesh, Paine seeks to cause chaos and disorder in Landmark City, giving him an opportunity to take it over.

Paine is also an accomplished martial artist. He and Axel fought many times during Season 1. After the Alpha Teens destroyed his base, Paine wanted to get rid of Axel once and for all. In what seemed like what was going to be their final battle, Paine revealed to Axel that he did not detonate the bomb that presumably killed his father. Paine was eventually defeated and sent back to jail.

In Season 2, Paine was sent a picture and was frightened. He asked for bodyguards and as a result, Axel and his Team were hired to protect Paine. But Dragon kidnapped Paine. Axel rescued Paine and gave him a picture of Sebastian and an unknown man. Paine said if Axel finds the man in the picture, he'll find the truth about his father.

Paine is an accomplished pianist and seems to be well educated. While Spydah and Flesh carry out most of his plans, Paine is not above hiring others to aid in said plans. He sometimes replaces Spydah and Flesh if they fail him or if he thinks that they are obsolete compared to whoever he hires. Paine uses his power on his minions capriciously, usually if they say or do something unintelligent or counterproductive.

Paine has black hair with red highlights and red eyes; he usually wears black pants and jacket, and a red T-shirt. He actually looks oddly similar to Axel. His personalized equipment includes the Jet Burner and the Street Shredder. Paine's daughter is Samantha, aka Magness. He is very protective of her well being.

Spydah
Roger "Spydah" Marcel (voiced by Tom Kenny) is a minion of Paine in spider-like armor who broke out of jail with him. He can create insect-themed machines which he treats as his pets. He wears a helmet equipped with six mini-cameras with night vision and infra-red capabilities. His eight detachable mechanical arms provide him with strength, dexterity, and climbing ability. He is also Paine's tech expert building or retooling machine's for Paine's plans.

Spydah helped to break Paine out of prison and is very loyal to him. He has fought all the members of the Alpha Teens but usually fights Lioness. In most of these confrontations he was usually beaten. At the end of season 1 he was defeated by Lioness, King, Shark and Hawk and then arrested with Paine after they failed to destroy Axel and the team's base.

He has since appeared in Season two, teamed up with Magness and D-Zel. He is finally arrested and returns in prison.

Spydah wants Paine to respect him; however, he has been a victim of Paine's insults and pain touch powers more often than not. He also thinks little of Flesh, who he considers to be big and stupid, even before his accident.

Spydah's design is inspired by Marvel Comics character Doctor Octopus.

Flesh
Albert "Flesh" (voiced by Bill Fagerbakke) was once a normal human who was a bodybuilding (he was as strong as King) thug who idolized Paine. He was hired by Paine to help him and Spydah steal Nutronium (a chemical that apparently could end Paine's pain) from Lee Industries. With the Alpha Teens' interference and the Nutronium not being where he thought it was, Paine threw a fit of rage. In his rage, Paine threw chemicals across the room he was in that accidentally hit Albert. This caused his body to mutate and grow to freakish proportions which also granted him super-human strength, far-surpassing King. While initially very angry with Paine, he reminded Albert who he idolized, causing him to regain his self-control.

Taking the name Flesh, an insult used by Lioness, he stayed working with Paine full-time. It has been implied that Paine was meant to cure Flesh after he took over Landmark City. Even before his accident, his barbells are his favorite weapons and as Flesh he is able to throw them with great precision. Sometimes they return to him like boomerangs.

Flesh has fought all the members of the Alpha Teens but usually fights King. In most of these confrontations he was usually beaten because even though Flesh is much stronger, King wins by outwitting him. At the end of season 1 he was defeated by Axel when he tried to escape with Paine and Spydah after they robbed a bank. He was arrested and sent to prison.

He appears briefly in prison in Season 2 where he shares his cell with Spydah and Dr. Recombo.

Flesh prides himself on his muscles and he loves being strong. He makes it clear in his debut episode that he doesn't like weak people. He doesn't like Spydah and he thinks that he's a freak and a weakling. Though Spydah implies that Flesh wasn't too smart before his accident, afterwards he says and does stupid things that often anger Paine. Like Spydah, he is often on the receiving end of Paine's pain powers when he does something Paine doesn't like.

Dragon
Dragon (voiced by Keith Szarabajka) is a ninja mercenary and the only Eastern Jo-Lan master and is first seen when he was hired by unknown clientele to steal an inhibitor that drains its wearer of their strength. He met Paine when he and Paine were unexpectedly robbing the same place. Paine sent Spydah and Flesh to take care of him only for Dragon to easily defeat them both. An impressed Paine knew he was both a Jo-Lan master and a mercenary and tripled his pay to give him the inhibitor and capture Axel Manning.

He finds the latter task slightly harder than expected. The situation gets complicated with the other Alpha Teens intervene. Dragon succeeds in his mission after he catches Axel completely off guard. When Dragon learns that Axel is the son of Sebastian Manning and seeing how Paine was going to kill Axel while he was wearing the inhibitor, Dragon cuts the inhibitor off him, telling Paine that "A Jo-Lan warrior deserves to meet his end with honor" and that he completed his job.

Paine was furious and ordered Spydah and Flesh to attack them, but the Alpha Teens found them and helped defeat them and destroy the inhibitor. After Axel and Dragon both briefly fought Paine, Dragon forces Axel into another fight. The battle was a near stalemate and Dragon retreated vowing that they'd meet again. Axel tried to find out what Dragon know about his father, but it was too late as Dragon disappeared.

Dragon was next seen in Hong Kong when both he and the Alpha Teens were trying to stop the power hungry Terrance Yao from misusing the power of the Sword of Jo-Lan. They were successful in defeating Yao and Axel trusted Dragon to keep the Sword of Jo-Lan safe. The move Dragon used to defeat Yao was apparently only known by Sebastian Manning which Dragon confirms but when Axel inquired if he had learned the move from his father, Dragon avoided the question and leaped off.

At the end of season one, he stands atop a rooftop, when a newspaper in the wind blows at his feet. He reads that Paine was arrested and throws the newspaper back into the wind.

Dragon feels a true warrior must walk their path alone, as opposed to Axel's view that his friends give him strength.

In "Fathers and Sons", Dragon is revealed to be a clone of Sebastian Manning, created by Lee during the Chrysalis project.

Magness
Samantha "Magness" Paine (voiced by Kari Wahlgren) is the daughter of Alexander Paine. She has had magnetic powers since birth. The extent of which is her ability to control most metals (gold being one exception), disrupting electronics, levitation and canceling Jo-Lan powers. Her magnetic powers are increased in extreme cold, i.e. a snowy mountain. But her powers are weakened by extreme heat, i.e. fire. Magness also knows martial arts to the point where she can keep up with Axel in a fair fight. While Magness is Paine's daughter, she is not officially part of his gang.

When the Alpha Teens go on vacation at a ski resort on Iron Mountain, a mountain made up mostly of iron ore, they first met Magness, under the guise of the ski resort's doctor. She tells them that a bunch of Landmark City's top officials, including its mayor, were meeting at the resort for a conference on crime. Right away she started flirting with Axel.

When a suspicious (and jealous) Lioness discovers her powers, Magness takes action tying her up with the resorts true doctor. Magness was ordered by Paine use her powers to vibrate the iron ore in the mountain to cause an avalanche burying Landmark City's officials alive. Paine also warned her about the Alpha Teens, so she tried to keep them out of the way and kill Axel personally.

She and Axel fought with his powers negated by hers. She accidentally ignited some fuel in a bunker, lighting it on fire. This made it hot enough for Axel to get his Jo-Lan powers back and defeat Magness. Before she could be taken into custody Paine rescues her and they escape in his helicopter.

Magness returns to Landmark City dating a street biker named D-Zel. When the two of them went to a night club they got into an unexpected confrontation with the Alpha Teens sans Hawk (who was home "cooking").

Paine was not pleased with her actions. On the heels of his latest plan, Paine told her to keep a low profile calling D-Zel a greaseball. She then sneaks out with Paine's Street Shredder and with D-Zel decide to get a new bike from Lee's R & D lab. Again unexpectedly, the two face off with the Alpha Teens. After D-Zel is accidentally merged with the new bike they were going to steal, he and Magness escape, in a sense getting what they wanted.

After Magness and D-Zel beat Paine to the punch on his plan and escaping from Paine, the Alpha Teens, and the police, Paine took the heat for the robbery. Angered that she was not given the credit for the heist, she finds out on TV that the Alpha Teens are temporally located at Mr. Lee's San Solomon estate. With D-Zel and his biker buddies, Magness sought to take out the Alpha Teens once and for all.

At San Solomon, Magness and the bikers attack the Alpha Teens with Magness going after Lioness. She was lured  by Lioness into Lee's ancient Egyptian exhibit room. Lioness kicks Magness into a gold covered sarcophagus. While D-Zel and the other bikers were also defeated and arrested, Magness was saved by and escaped with Spydah after she called Paine for help.

She was not seen again until the end of season 1, where she's seen on Landmark City's JumboTron that the Alpha Teens help police re-capture her father. She is so angry that she screams and uses her powers to blow up the JumboTron. She has since appeared in Season two, forming her own gang with D-Zel and Spydah. She is the only of three to successfully escape the prison.

Magness has black hair with red highlights and violet eyes. Her uniform is black with red trim. Magness is a rebel who seems to be interested in and knowledgeable about motorcycles and off-road vehicles. While Paine instills fear and control in his minions and the citizens of Landmark City, Magness often challenges her father's authority. She disobeys him constantly but still he bails her out of trouble anyway.

Janus Lee
Janus Lee (voiced by Tom Kenny) is the inventor and founder of Lee Industries. A rich and successful businessman, he held various assets throughout the city (e.g. banks, prisons, hospitals, malls, labs, factories, plazas etc.) and over 6,000 separate patents on inventions. He was the one who started the Alpha Teens team after he tested them on his game show, "Trackdown" in season 1. He gave them access to Lee Industries vehicles for testing and also let them use them to stop Paine or any other villain threatening Landmark City. In both cases the vehicles usually end up getting trashed, mostly being unintentional, but Lee always paid for new ones.

After a crazy disgruntled former employee of Lee Industries named Silas Green was defeated by the Alpha Teens, he tried to warn them about Lee betraying them just like he did him. Due to him trying to kill them moments earlier, Green's message fell on mostly deaf ears with Hawk dismissing him as paranoid. Afterwards, Lee's true nature slowly began to reveal itself. He began to act suspiciously doing things like mysteriously pocketing Hawk and Shark's loose hair and either lying or misinforming the team about his whereabouts when he goes on business. After Paine raided Lee Industries, Axel and Garrett stumbled into a room that was off limits to anyone but Lee. In it was DNA samples of the team and five new uniforms. At the end of season 1, it was revealed that Lee genetically created a reptilian-like creature dubbed the "Axel Manning advanced enhancement".

In season 2 following Paine is defeated, Mr. Lee fires the Alpha Team, stripping them of their access to Lee Industries and its vehicles and of their credit line. He apologizes twice and explains that the company "...is moving away from vehicles and into bio-tech". After Axel had some lethal run-ins with the reptilian-like creature, Lee tracks it down and reveals to Axel that the creature, whom Lee named Tilian, is Axel's clone. He states that he started work on Tilian shortly after he met Axel.

Lee's reasoning for doing this is to save the world from war, greed, and ignorance using genetic engineering. He intends to "...create a race of creatures that can outperform, outthink and outlast any mere human". Also, he intends to create these creatures similar in appearance to humans to make sure that they get positions in power with Lee admitting that he will lead initially.

After hearing that this is why Lee formed the Alpha Teens in the first place, Axel felt angry and betrayed and stated that he would do everything in his power to stop him. The rest of the team, Garrett, and the board of directors for Lee Industries were also informed of Lee's plans. The board of directors promptly stripped Lee of all his power, but not before he experimented on himself. Lee sought to make himself fifty times stronger and smarter than he already was. After Tilian was knocked into the pod Lee was in, it exploded and while Lee survived, he became completely insane.

He revealed to Axel that Tilian was part of a Mu-Team, which will help him complete his objective to "help" mankind. Also, Lee has created an armor made out of hard light technology (light images that actual can come in physical contact with solid and liquid materials). He is also now able to form a vehicle out of hard light thanks to King's temporally evil brother Duke. He also has seemed to work with Dr. Recombo in the past.

In the season two finale, Lee is badly injured by Dragon which caused his hard light energy to fuse with him slowly. After revealing his role in Project Chrysalis and membership in the Serpent Tale organization, Quan visited him to silent him by using his Ju Lan to mess up his Ki, causing a mass explosion that seemingly kills Lee. However, he later on reappears in front of the Alpha Teen group, fully merged with his hard light energy from his suit, to teleport them to safety as their underwater home is destroyed.

Mu-Team
The Mu-Team are genetically altered clones of the Alpha Teens by Mr. Lee. Each member has the traits of who they are cloned from and the animals they had mutated into their DNA. They are fiercely loyal to Mr. Lee and are very aggressive. Their members include:

 Tilian (voiced by James Arnold Taylor) is a clone of Axel that was merged with the DNA of a cobra, a crocodile, a gecko, and a chameleon where he sports green scales, a snake-like tongue, and orange hair as well as being taller and stronger. He first appears in the first episode of season 2 by tracking down Axel. Tilian was defeated by Axel and he fell down a rock face under Mr. Lee's mansion, which left him gravely injured. Mr. Lee recovered him and made him apparently ten times better by mixing Axel's DNA with Mutanium (an unstable chemical) and putting it into Tilian. He can shoot venom from his fangs that hardens and immobilizes any body part it touches temporarily, talk and command snakes to do his bidding, change color to blend in with surfaces like a chameleon, make his snake-like tongue longer than a chameleon's tongue, and regenerate lost limbs.
 Wrecka (voiced by Aldis Hodge) is a clone of King that was merged with the DNA of an elephant, a rhinoceros, and a hippopotamus where he sports blue skin, dreadlocks, and a rhinoceros-like horn on his head. He first appears in the third episode of season 2 with Firekat. They were sent by Mr. Lee to destroy Axel and the rest of the team. Wrecka has super-strength enough to lift a car and an elephant's charging power. Wrecka's horn is also a great asset especially when Mr. Lee upgrades Wrecka to emit electricity from it.
 Firekat (voiced by Alli Mauzey) is a clone of Lioness that was merged with the DNA of a cheetah, a lion, a cougar, and a tiger where she sports cat ears, claws, and a tail. She first appears in the third episode of season 2 with Wrecka. They were sent by Mr. Lee to destroy Axel and the rest of the team. Firekat has the speed of the cheetah that enables her to move as fast as a car, the ability to slice completely through some of the hardest surfaces, the ability to see in the dark, and powerful jumping ability. She also has a giant metal claw as a weapon. In her free time, Firekat likes to clean herself like a cat.
 Stingfly (voiced by Charlie Schlatter) is a clone of Hawk that was merged with the DNA of a hornet, a wasp, a dragonfly, and a beetle where he sports insect-like eyes, insect wings, a hornet abdomen, and gray skin. He first appears in the fourth episode of season 2 with Rayza. He was sent by Mr. Lee to take care of the Alpha Teens, who set to save Shark and Dr. Logan. Stingfly's insect wings gives him the ability to fly. He can also stick to walls, uses banshee-like howling to stun enemies, and shoot acid eggs from his tail.
 Rayza (voiced by Brian Donovan) is a clone of Shark that was merged with the DNA of a piranha, an eel, a jellyfish, and a barracuda where he sports light green skin, gills, and shark teeth. He first appears in the fourth episode of season 2 with Stingfly. He was sent by Mr. Lee to find and capture the government genetic scientist, Dr. Logan. Rayza can bite through metal with his piranha/barracuda-like teeth, breathe both underwater and on land with his gills, shoot laser beams from his arms, and emit electricity from his body like an electric eel.

Other villains
The following villains either are one-time associates of Alexander Paine or operate on their own where they are listed in order of appearances:

Cannonball Bros.
The Cannonball Brothers are sibling acrobats that were prisoners at Talon Penitentiary until Paine broke them out. They worked for a circus where they would pickpocket valuables from their audience after the shows. Paine came to them stating that they owed him for breaking them out.

The two helped Paine and Spydah break into Lee Industries to find Axel Manning and his team. The fought and easily outmatched King, Hawk and Shark but were defeated by Lioness with one kick. They were arrested when the police arrived.

The duo made a cameo appearance in the WWC battle royal for the WWC title along with King and Vinnie Rossi. Whether if this was really them or two guys dressed like them is unknown.

When Hawk and King were unjustly arrested, the Cannonball Bros. were two of the villains to make their stay in prison very difficult. After King and Recombo started a food fight, they and the other villains imprisoned because of the Alpha Teens attacked King and Hawk. Lioness, who came with Axel to breakout their teammates, tricks these two into thinking that she thinks they're cute. As the Alpha Teens escape from the prison, Lioness being the last one out, the brothers chase her but get stuck in the hole she dived in. They were used to seal off the Alpha Teens escape route.

The Cannonball Brothers are athletically gifted, but they lack intelligence. They also often bicker back and forth like little children at times.

Architect
Silas Greene (voiced by Yuri Lowenthal) is the genius designer of Lee Plaza, whom Mr. Lee had fired before the completion of the project. Greene stated that Lee was going to say that he was imbalanced as the reason of his termination. Calling Lee a "two-faced personification of backstabbing corporate greed", Greene wanted vengeance and "his building", Lee Plaza. Thus, he became the Architect.

Intending to kill Mr. Lee as well as the Alpha Teens and the head of Landmark City's Building Security Board, the Architect controlled the entire building from the command center in its penthouse. He used the building's robotic security drones, waste management system (robots that vaporize trash), ventilation system, elevator system and trash incinerator and his own added features like mobile electric wires that can fire lasers as well as a laser grid in the ladies room to accomplish this. Axel, Hawk, Lioness and Mr. Lee reached the Penthouse but the Architect escaped and attempted to blow them up by overloading the room's power core but failed after the room's reinforced safety chamber kicked in. In a last-ditch effort to not get caught, the Architect activated every security drone he could to stop them, he also rerouted the gasoline into the building's sprinkler system. This effort was in vain as he was eventually driven to the roof, where Lee and Axel waited for him. The seemingly defeated Architect had one last trick up his sleeve, turning many security drones into a giant robotic mech that encased him. He knocked Lee off the building, unaware that he was saved by a window washing platform. With a combined shots from the Lioness, Hawk, Shark, King and the Security Board head using the technology the Architect himself manipulated and a Jo-Lan powered uppercut from Axel, the Architect was knocked off the building slamming into the ground below. With his robotic mech destroyed, the Architect was detained by police. Before he went to prison, he attempted to tell the Alpha Teens not to trust Lee and for them not to believe anything he says. While the Alpha Teens didn't believe him after he just tried to kill them, unfortunately for them he was right.

When Hawk and King were unjustly arrested, Architect was one of the villains to make their stay in prison very difficult. After King and Recombo started a food fight, he and the other villains imprisoned because of the Alpha Teens attacked King and Hawk. The Architect was seen being chased by prison guards in the background during Bogey and Hawk's fight.

Silas Greene is very intelligent but he is so overcome with hatred for Mr. Lee, that he doesn't care who he hurts to get to him. He is crazed to be certain, but it's never explained how or when he got that way or if Lee was telling the truth about his termination at all. Greene also seems to like opera, breaking out into song every time he's about to unleash a major attack.

The Architect is similar to X-Men villain Arcade.

Dr. Recombo
Dr. Recombo (voiced by Danny Mann) is a genetic scientist who experimented with various species of animals by fusing them together. He can control these creature's DNA by special remote and has several of these creatures under and at his disposal. Also, he experimented on himself, turning him into a vicious creature that can stretch his limbs. He hid his true appearance under a disguise that looked like his old body. His colleagues, who gave him his moniker, seemingly laughed at him and told that such experimentation couldn't be done.

Bent on proving them wrong, Dr. Recombo took shelter on an island inside an abandoned radiation testing lab from the 1950s. He discovered that the radiation from the tests turned the lava in the island's volcano green. The green lava can alter all forms of DNA. When Dr. Recombo extracts and redefines the lava, he can use it to combine different species into new more powerful super-species. With hidden cameras on the island, Dr. Recombo became aware of the film crew that was stationed on the island to film "Radioactive Island" which was supposed to star Hawk. King's aggression against the movie's giant robotic crab impressed both the film's director (who replaced Hawk as the lead) as well as Dr. Recombo. With intentions of ruling the world, Dr. Recombo has his eyes set on King as a worthy human specimen for his experiments. He captures King and fuses him with one of his already mutated creatures. When Axel, Shark and Lioness come to save King, Dr. Recombo has the now mutated King and his other creatures to attack them. King breaks free of his control but is weakened by Dr. Recombo's control. Lioness recovers Dr. Recombo's remote and sets the creatures free. An angered Dr. Recombo shows the Alpha Teens his true form, a freakish genetically altered monster. The mutated King does battle with Dr. Recombo. Dr. Recombo is defeated by King and Lioness and the team returns King to normal. As the Alpha Teens left the island, they dropped Dr. Recombo off with the authorities on the next island.

When Hawk and King were unjustly arrested, Dr. Recombo was one of the villains to make their stay in prison very difficult. Recombo seems to be a mostly normal human now with the exception of his frog jumping skill and long, sticky and strong frog's tongue. He still held a grudge against King for him not accepting "higher evolution" and getting Dr. Recombo sent to prison. After he and King started a food fight, he and the other villains imprisoned because of the Alpha Teens attacked King and Hawk. Recombo was defeated by Axel after he and Lioness came to breakout King and Hawk.

It has been revealed that Dr. Recombo created a mutant creature out of a baby tiger cub. The creature, dubbed Hybridon, escaped into Blue Pines National Park where the Alpha Teens were taking a vacation. The Alpha Teens stop the beast, but begin to form a connection between Dr. Recombo and Mr. Lee even when Mr. Lee later springs him from prison.

Doctor Eel
Dr. E. Elle aka Doctor Eel (voiced by Maurice LaMarche) is a scientist with a laboratory at the bottom of the ocean. He has a full bodysuit equipped with a mask and an arm cannon that can fire electricity. He uses mind control discs to make sea creatures (sharks, swordfish, squid etc.) his obedient pets. Also, he was able to create seaweed that grow very rapidly and wrap around intruders.

Doctor Eel started a project called "Neptune's Revenge" where he used his "pets", namely a giant squid to sink ships. The project was funded by Paine who sought to get rid of Axel Manning and the rest of the Alpha Teens, who were at a party on Mr. Lee's yacht. Shark unintentionally stumbled across this plan when he was caught by Doctor Eel's giant squid while he was swimming. When the others at Mr. Lee's party started to get worried, Axel and King went to search for him. Meanwhile, Lee's yacht was being attacked by two giant squids. Axel and King followed Shark's Scubasled to where it had been tracked and found Doctor Eel's lab. The two saved Shark who explained what's been going on and found out that Paine is behind it. Axel confronted Doctor Eel one on one. The two fought until Axel used a Jo-Lan attack on Doctor Eel accidentally making him blast part of his lab. With his lab and life's work being destroyed as a result, Axel, King and Shark force Eel to surrender. He was detained by the three as they saved Mr. Lee, Lioness and Hawk from the sinking ship. Doctor Eel was taken to prison shortly afterwards.

When Hawk and King were unjustly arrested, Doctor Eel was one of the villains to make their stay in prison very difficult. Without his bodysuit, Eel had light blue skin and dark blue hair. He was also able to sneak in a pet electric eel that willingly listens to him. He sent the eel from his sink to the sink in Hawk and King's cell. It attacked Hawk before escaping down the drain. After King and Recombo started a food fight, he and the other villains imprisoned because of the Alpha Teens attacked King and Hawk. Lioness, who came with Axel to breakout their teammates, kicked a cup of water at Eel and his pet, electrocuting them both.

Bogey
Bogey (voiced by Thomas F. Wilson) is a highly talented hotshot pilot who has history with Hawk. As a flight school student, Bogey and Hawk pushed each other to see who was the best pilot, but Bogey's reckless actions almost got them both killed. As a result, both men were expelled after Bogey put the whole blame on Hawk for the incident during an inquest. They haven't seen each other until Bogey disrupted Hawk's solo performance at an airshow. After a brief verbal exchange, they agreed to race around Landmark City. After Bogey flew through a building that was under construction, something Hawk avoided so he would not hurt anyone, Bogey won the race. After they landed, Hawk confronted Bogey which led to a fight after Bogey said that he was the better pilot. It turns out that Bogey was being tested by Paine to see if he was worthy to steal Lee Industries' Hypersonic Stratojet, a jet that flies in the upper atmosphere at speeds exceeding mach 5. Aided by Flesh, Bogey acquired the Stratojet's launch codes and successfully stole the jet itself. Hawk and Axel were lucky enough to get on board the jet before it took off. When the Stratojet reached the upper atmosphere, it entered free-fall with no gravity. Bogey and Flesh would take on their two stowaways. Eventually Bogey was outsmarted by Hawk in battle while they were still in free-fall. With their mission failed and the Stratojet burning up on reentry Bogey and Flesh escaped in an escape pod. The Stratojet was damaged but landed without exploding thanks to Hawk and Axel while Bogey was stuck with a sick Flesh in the middle of the ocean. Bogey was arrested sometime later with Axel knowing of it. This implies that the Alpha Teens might have helped to put him there.

When Hawk and King were unjustly arrested, Bogey was one of the villains to make their stay in prison very difficult. After King and Recombo started a food fight, he and the other villains imprisoned because of the Alpha Teens attacked King and Hawk. Bogey and Hawk were in an evenly matched fight until the prison guards scared Bogey off.

Bogey's ego can rival Hawk's and they both are talented pilots. However, Hawk cares about the well being of the innocent while Bogey cares about winning and succeeding at any cost. Also, Hawk is not the type to leave a crashing plane unless he has no other choice, Bogey has no problems with doing that himself.

Optical
Optical (voiced by Jess Harnell) is a special effects specialist, whose holographic imaging system can change his appearance for short periods of time. He only needs to impersonate a person's voice or actions to impersonate them. He also can copy their retinal scans if he scans their eyes with the blinding light coming out of his mechanical eye.

He was hired by Paine to frame Axel for an armored car robbery and keeping the real Axel distracted by pretending to be his supposedly deceased father, Sebastian. Even though the Alpha Teens discovered Optical's ruse, the police were able to track Axel down and arrest him. The next part of Optical's mission was to help Paine steal plutonium from Landmark City's nuclear power plant. To do this he gave holographic imaging systems to Paine, Spydah and Flesh and they pretended to be the other four Alpha Teen members. With optical scans he stole from the rest of the team, Optical along with Paine's gang  gained access the Mechcavateors, giant robots mechs used for construction. With the Mechavateors, Paine would break into the power plant and steal the plutonium with ease. The real Alpha Teens, including Axel, who escaped from police custody, stopped Paine's plan by destroying the Mechcavators. Optical was the first one beaten and King arrested him while Paine and his gang escaped.

When Hawk and King were unjustly arrested, Optical was one of the villains to make their stay in prison very difficult. In prison, Optical created a crude version of the holographic imaging system, which makes him able to walk around freely as a guard as opposed to being kept in a cell. In the cafeteria Optical posed as a cafeteria worker and spit in Hawk's food. After King and Recombo started a food fight, he and the other villains imprisoned because of the Alpha Teens attacked King and Hawk. Optical was defeated by Axel after he and Lioness came to breakout King and Hawk.

Mass
Vinnie "Mass" Rossi (voiced by Brian Cummings) was a two-bit extortionist who was strong enough to punch through brick. He rhymes most of what he says after his mom always said be unique.

He was hired by Paine to enter a wrestling battle royal to win the WWC title belt so Paine can use the belt's diamonds for his new laser. Paine only went to Rossi after Flesh badly injured his leg because Paine overworked him. When Spydah suggested him, Paine implied that he was dumber than Flesh. When Paine approached Rossi about his offer, Rossi said that he'd think about it but Paine used his pain touch on him to force him to do it. In the battle royal, Rossi was one of only two participants left with the other being King. Despite his heelish actions, Rossi was tossed out of the ring by King losing the match. He was distracted by the attractive Lioness who was cheering for King. At the docks, Vinnie tried to apologize to Paine, but when he told him that he was in love, Paine angrily shoved Rossi in a mining car. Concrete was dumped on top of Rossi as Paine dropped him into the sea. Little did Paine know, there was radioactive waste near where Rossi had sunk to. The waste mutated Rossi into a giant mass of concrete with iron pipes sticking out of his shoulders, although he retained his voice. When Paine and Flesh went back to steal the belt, the now mutated Rossi followed them. Inside the vault where the belt was kept, Rossi, now wanting to be called Vinnie "The Mass" Rossi, interrupted a confrontation between Paine and Flesh and the Alpha Teens. He proved to be invulnerable to Paine's powers and Axel's Jo-Lan and stronger than Flesh and King. Mass takes the title belt, kidnaps Lioness and escapes. With the belt Mass intended to retire and then make Lioness his wife. When he went to see his momma, Paine and Flesh came to get the belt back. Paine fired on an unharmed Mass who was protecting his momma and Lioness. Paine threw his mother on a gurney and he chased after her losing the belt in the process. His mother saved, Mass asks Lioness to marry him. Though while she appreciated him sticking up for her from his mother's judgment and she thought his care with a baby he rescued was neat. All the same, Lioness told him she wasn't attracted to him due to his appearance. Deeply hurt and greatly angered, Mass turned on Lioness and in a fit of rage almost leveled the entire hospital. His attempt was halted by King, so Mass sought a rematch between the two. King was nearly defeated until Axel found some sleeping gas and threw it in Mass' mouth. Mass was knocked out and fell several stories down. Still sleeping, Mass was carted off to jail on a gurney.

Sometime later during him being transferred to another prison, Mass was rescued by Spydah and Flesh. Paine needed him for an underground assignment, where his rock body won't be affected by the intense heat that regular humans can't handle. Mass initially refused, but with his mother captured by Paine, he reluctantly agreed. Flesh unintentionally told Mass that Paine was holding his mother next to their location. He breaks into Paine's lair and rescues his momma. He tells Lioness, who she and her team were there to stop Paine, that they weren't meant to last, completely over his feelings for her. Mass' momma tells him to get Paine. After reaching Paine, Paine tries to make with deal with him to still help him. Mass again objects but his momma says that they can rule Landmark City. He likes the sound of "Mayor Momma Rossi" so he decided to still help Paine. He was sent to take a bomb to a lava crater so he can blow it up and flood Landmark City with lava. Axel stopped him before he could do so and threw the bomb in a hole they were climbing out of. Axel made it out before the bomb went off, but Mass was caught in the explosion with some Lava from the crater engulfing him. The Mass was fused with the lava, but he survived. All he was concerned about was finding his momma.

Even though he's a villain, Mass seemingly has some compassion and caring for others. There is no question that Mass is threatening, overly aggressive and easily angered, but he has shown how gentle he can be around women (his Momma and Lioness) and children (the baby he helped save).

Mass full first name is also into question. Paine calls him Vincent while his Momma calls him Vincenzo.

Momma Rossi
Momma Rossi (voiced by Pat Musick) is the mother of Vinnie "The Mass" Rossi and the person who inspired him to be unique, hence the rhyming. She was at the event where her son was wrestling for the WWC title, but saw that he was looking at Lioness in the crowd instead of focusing on the match. When Vinnie became Mass, he brought Lioness to the hospital where she was staying and claimed that she was his future wife. Momma looked Lioness over and told him that there wasn't enough meat on her bones and that he could do better. Mass protected her and Lioness after Paine tried to kill them. Momma tried to protect Mass but Paine threw her on a gurney and she was flying down the hallways with Mass chasing after her. After Mass saved her, she helped save a baby from the fire Paine started in the hospital. When she returned, her "baby" was in a fight with King and she cheered him on, even knocking out Hawk when he was cheering King on. When Mass was knocked out by Axel, she said that she'd never forgive him (although asked if he wanted to date her daughter Victoria if he was single).

Sometime later, she was kidnapped by Paine and used as a way to get Mass' cooperation in his newest plan. After both her son and the Alpha Teens break into Paine's lair, Mass frees her and they go after Paine. After Paine makes a deal with Mass, Momma Rossi saw them taking over Landmark City, with her as mayor and the deal was struck. With Mass on his mission, Paine tossed Momma Rossi in a trash bin, and effectively betraying her. After the Alpha Teens stopped Paine and Mass, a garbage truck delivered her to the Landmark City dump, head first in the trash.

Bonez
Bonez (voiced by Pete Sepenuk) is a scientist who was able to turn humans into zombies with a nano-virus and his skull mask. The zombies he created can also spread the nano-virus by biting someone. With the nano-virus he has these zombies under his control. He also carries an energy scythe as his weapon. A man with a disfigured face Bonez was considered an outcast in Landmark City. Seeking his revenge, Bonez leaves Landmark City and makes a home in the Underworld, the remains of the old Landmark City after a massive earthquake that is located under the new Landmark City that was built over it. After kidnapping people and stealing vehicles from all over the city making the people his zombies, Bonez left his green skull symbol where he hit. On Halloween night, the Alpha Teens were sent by Mr. Lee to investigate the disappearance of the Mecha Speeder, a vehicle made by his company. The Mecha Speeder was last seen on a boat called the Seaserpent, and both it and the ship's crew were taken by Bonez. The Alpha Teens find Underworld and Bonez when he captures Hawk. After Hawk and eventually Shark and Lioness were turned into zombies, Bonez planned to attack the Landmark City with his zombie army during the full moon. Axel and King discover that sunlight returns the zombies to normal and they fire at the concrete above letting sunlight into Underworld. Bonez faces Axel but Axel forces him back with his Jo-Lan. Bonez was caught in an explosion when his scythe cut through some of the energy weapons he had stored in his car. Bonez's remains are not found in the wreckage and he is later revealed to be alive.

Team Omega
Team Omega is a group formed by Paine to stop the Alpha Teens for good. Tired of leaving this task to Spydah and Flesh, who almost always fail, Paine held tryouts at a rundown theater for new blood. Sadly, each audition was worse than the next. Paine decides to use contestants in the Ultimate Challenge Race, a competition the Alpha Teens were to take place in. The results were much more favorable and Paine had his team. Their objective was to permanently eliminate the Alpha Teens at the competition. After they thought they had got rid of the Alpha Teens, they helped Paine steal Nitro Alkalide and attempt to put it into an oil pipeline. They were defeated by the Alpha Teens after each member barely survived their last encounter with Team Omega. The five were arrested by police and Paine escaped.

Their members include:

 Edge (voiced by Jeff Bennett) – A punk rocker skateboarder with a cockney accent who fights with a raw and brutal style. His objective was to take out Axel in the skateboarding event. At the competition he threatens Axel and throws him off the track. Afterwards he was the most interested in getting paid, unaware that they were going to double their pay by helping Paine at the pipeline. He was later defeated by Axel and his Jo-Lan in battle.
 Radman (voiced by Tom Kenny) – A motocross biker who had beady eyes and front teeth that looks similar to rat's teeth. His dirtbike is equipped with sawblades at the wheels. He was assigned to Lioness at the dirtbike event. During his race, Radman comes up from behind Lioness and uses his sawblades to slash her tires. Lioness soon loses control of her bike sending her over an embankment. When the Alpha Teens came back to stop Paine's plan, Radman attempted to attack Axel with a forklift. He was stopped by King and was knocked off the platform with one punch.
 Buffy (voiced by Susan Egan) – A buff woman in overalls with attitude. She's strong enough to beat a super-strong Flesh in arm wrestling (although he used his giant pinky) knocking him on the floor in the process. She was put to task against King in the ATV jousting event. Buffy is easily beaten by King as she is forced off her ATV onto the ledge of the cliff they were on. She acted innocent and fragile so King would help her up. When King grabbed her hand to do this, Buffy pulled him over the cliff. At the area of the pipeline, Buffy tried to smash King with steel beams, from the crane she was operating. King escaped in time and Hawk flew in and grabbed Buffy out of the crane dropping her into the ocean.
 Icarus (voiced by Jeff Bennett impersonating John Travolta) – A narcissistic areal expert with a Tony Manero accent. He has a jetpack that can go at incredible speeds. Icarus also has a pair of goggles that act like binoculars, a rope he can fire from his wrists and laser beams he can fire from his gloves. He was put ego to ego with Hawk in the jetpack capture the flag event. When Paine describes Hawk as "Idiotic and vain", Icraus says that he "...hates those types", quickly pulling out a can of hairspray and fixing his hair. During the competition, he slams Hawk into a turbine breaking his jetpack and uses his rope to toss Hawk off. At the pipeline, Icarus was in pursuit of Hawk, when Lioness stomped on his back in mid-air. He was knocked so low, he crashed into a stack of boxes on the platform.
 Gator Girl – A surfer girl who has sharp shark-like teeth that can go through glass, metal and plastic and alligator scale tattoos all over her body (hence her nickname). She was selected to deal with Shark in the surfing event. With the competition underway, Gator Girl tries to take a chunk out of Shark, but he blocks her attack with his surfboard, which breaks in half. With no time to react, Shark plunges over a waterfall. At the pipeline, Paine needed her to bite a hole in it to put in the Nitro Alkalide. She did this but found Shark inside, and he leaped forward, knocking Gator Girl out.

D-Zel
D-Zel (voiced by Jess Harnell) is a lowlife street biker who dated Magness when she came back to Landmark City.

When the two of them went to a night club, they got into an unexpected confrontation with the Alpha Teens sans Hawk (who was home "cooking"). He fought King until Spydah and Flesh forcefully took Magness to see Paine. He was knocked down by Spydah in a futile effort to rescue her. Magness leaves with Paine's Street Shredder and with D-Zel decide to get a new bike from Lee's R & D lab. Again unexpectedly, the two face off with the Alpha Teens. After facing Axel, both on Mr. Lee's new motorbikes, D-Zel and the bike are knocked down on a conveyor belt. D-Zel and the bike enter a machine that accidentally merged him with it. As a man-bike hybrid, D-Zel can stand straight like a man or go into bike mode and ride like a bike. He can also extend his left leg out for a far range kicking attack. After the accident, he and Magness escape, in a sense getting what they wanted. After Magness and D-Zel beat Paine to the punch on his plan and escaping from Paine, the Alpha Teens, and the police, Paine took the heat for the robbery. D-Zel was content for Paine getting the blame but Magness wanted credit for the heist. She finds out on TV that the Alpha Teens are temporarily located at Mr. Lee's San Solomon estate. With D-Zel and his biker buddies, Magness sought to take out the Alpha Teens once and for all. At San Solomon, D-Zel faced Axel on inside a giant maze garden. Axel tricked D-Zel into being engulfed by one of Lee's robot gardeners. He was trapped in a bale of cut grass and he and the other bikers were defeated and arrested. Magness, also defeated, was saved by and escaped with Spydah after she called Paine for help via her cellphone.

D-Zel and his biker pals appeared again with Magness and helped her with a plot to smuggle some gold out of the city using the Rock band Body Hammer. They had melted and reformed the gold they stole into the Rock Band's robotic dancing machine in order to smuggle it out of the city. D-Zel was defeated and arrested by Axel.

D-Zel returns in Season 2 with Magness and Spydah, only to be arrested once again.

Boon and Fender
Boon and Fender (voiced by Danny Mann and Maurice LaMarche respectively) were a police sergeant and court judge for Landmark City respectively. They both were being blackmailed by Paine for something that would cost them both their jobs. Boon was instructed to frame the Alpha Teens and Garrett for grand theft auto and arrest them. The Alpha Teens tried to escape after they figured out that they were corrupt, but King and Hawk were caught. Fender's job was to sentence them 30 years to hard labor and rid Paine of them for good. In a rescue attempt of Hawk and King, the Alpha Teens faked their deaths. The two met at a diner thinking that their problems were over. Hawk taped their confession, including Boon giving Paine the key to the evidence locker to recover a weapon he was going to use to kill the graduating police officers. While Fender warned Paine to strike, Boon attempted to slow them down. Boon crashed into a fountain when Hawk and Lioness used their T.A.G.blasters to pop his tires. With Hawk's video as evidence, both Boon and Fender were arrested.

Terrance Yao
Terrance Yao (voiced by James Sie) is a Hong Kong billionaire and tycoon for the global conglomerate, Yao Federated. He also secretly was the head of one of Hong Kong's criminal clans, including a group of ninjas. He sent these ninjas to Landmark City to steal the Sword of Jo-Lan, a sword that gives its wielder mystical powers. The ninjas mission was a success, but not without running into the Alpha Teens and Dragon. The Alpha Teens fly to Hong Kong to question Yao, after one of his company's helicopters was used. They questioned him but he states that the helicopter was stolen from him and he had nothing to do with the robbery. In actuality Yao wanted to use the sword to gain the supreme power of Jo-Lan during the eclipse of the sixth moon, which is an event that takes place once every 300 years. Yao would become invulnerable and invincible with enough power to rule the world. Yao tried to rid himself of his enemies before the eclipse but did not succeed. At the top of Yao Tower, Yao became stronger during the eclipse, but the ceremony was not yet over. This gave Axel and Dragon time to stop him. While most of their attacks were ineffective against Yao, Dragon and Axel were victorious after a last second attack by Dragon that disarmed Yao and the sword's safe recovery by Axel. With the Sword of Jo-Lan out of his hands and the ceremony over, Yao lost all the power he had gained. Axel gave the sword to Dragon for him to protect it and Yao was arrested by Hong Kong authorities. Before he was driven away by police, Yao promised vengeance against Axel sooner than he thinks.

Hybridon
Hybridon (voiced by Jeff Black) was a tiger cub that was experimented on by Recombo. As a result of these experiments, it became a giant monstrous creature where the tiger cub was spliced with different DNA samples where it sports the face and front paws of a tiger, the hood of a cobra, a snake-headed appendage in its mouth, the back legs of a rhinoceros, the stomach and stinger of a European hornet, the teeth, back fin, and tail of a shark, and the back legs of a rhinoceros. It was initially discovered in Blue Pines National Park, which forced the park to close until wildlife experts could find and catch it. A giant pair of cast-iron shackles that Hybridon was wearing, before it chewed through them was found on the path from the park to Mr. Lee's San Solomon estate. The path itself is owned by Mr. Lee, suggesting that he aided Recombo to mutate the creature. None of this was made aware to the Alpha Teens who went camping in Blue Pines entering the park through the back way. Axel eventually finds out, but not before Hybridon smelled food at their campsite emitting from Shark and Hawk's tent. Hawk was knocked out by the beast when he went to investigate. It dragged the tent away with Shark still sleeping inside. It ate Shark's food and almost him too, but he was rescued by the rest of his team. Hybridon was defeated by Axel after he used a powerful weapon given to him by a park ranger. It was caged by the wildlife services the next morning.

In "Zoo Story", Hybridon is shown to be locked in a zoo where it was targeted by the Mu-Team so that Janus Lee can have a control chip placed on it and control it. He even used a DNA enhancing formula to improve it's ferocity. It went on the loose and caused havoc before saving King from being pushed off the cliff by Wrecka. Before falling into the ocean upon part of the cliff breaking off, Hybridon grabbed King and threw him onto the cliff. Hybridon then swam out into the ocean.

The name Hybridon comes from the action figure the creature is based on and later being referred to by its name during the second appearance.

Supporting characters

Garrett
Garrett (voiced by Alexander Polinsky) is a super genius who works for Lee Industries. He enrolled in college at a young age having two semesters with Professor Evans in a course of sonic engineering and software application. Evans was also his research adviser. At thirteen, he received his college Ph. D and was hired by Mr. Lee that same year.

Before the Alpha Team was formed, he developed Mr. Lee's vehicles and when he was of age, road tested them as well. When a turbo ATV that he constructed and test drove broke apart, he injured two people as well as himself. The other victims recovered, but Garrett was paralyzed from the waist down.

Now a paraplegic, he is equipped with a technologically advanced wheelchair that can extend its height and climb on walls and ceilings. Garrett was guilt ridden after the accident, refusing to drive another vehicle again. Axel and the others helped show how invaluable he was and how he needed to get over the past.

While he still developed new vehicles for the company, he started modifying the Alpha Teens existing vehicles and gear as well as inventing new ones. After Lee was forced out of his company, Garrett stayed with Lee Industries and still proving to be a great asset to the team.

Colonel Richter
Colonel Richter (voiced by Jess Harnell) is a special agent with Landmark City's law enforcement. He firsts crosses paths with the Alpha Teens when he believes that they have become criminals. When it is revealed that it was the shape-changing Optical along with Paine's gang who set them up, Richter dropped the charges against them. He would later help them capture Team Omega as well as a corrupt police sergeant and corrupt judge that worked for Paine.

During Richter's attempt to catch Paine, Axel and his team interrupted it taking it upon themselves to stop him. After Paine escapes, Richter and Axel (who tries to capture Paine on the anniversary of his dad's death) go at each other's throats. When Axel captures Paine a day later, Richter still doesn't approve of Axel's methods, but is relieved that Paine is going back to prison.

He doesn't appear, nor is mentioned in Season 2.

Eliza
Eliza is Lioness's cousin; she is skilled in capoeira and is an engineering expert. The two cousins grew up together in Brazil and are close. Eliza didn't think that Lioness respected her. With her assistance, Garrett and the Alpha Teens defeated Paine from destroying Landmark City. She also saved Lioness from Spydah. Lioness offered Eliza the opportunity to live with the team. She declined, wanting to set her own path in life and not following Lioness' anymore. She was given a job with Lee Industries working on projects for Mr. Lee in South America. Shark and Hawk both liked her and fought over her. She decided that she liked Garrett the most, whom she went on her first date with before she left.

Duke Kingston
Duke Kingston is King's twelve-year-old brother who is enrolled in the Landmark City School for the Gifted, of which he has the highest IQ. During King's wrestling coaching at his school with Axel, King was mothering Duke, asking him if he took his asthma medication and not letting him be a volunteer for some of King's moves. When King, Axel and Hawk left the school, Mr. Lee and the Mu-Team made their move.

Lee hooked Duke and his classmates to a machine that drained the brain power from his classmates. transferring it into Duke. Duke became smarter than fifty Albert Einsteins and has ability to use telekinetic powers fifty times more powerful than the very small latent ability each human has. This process also turned Duke and the other students evil. This new evil side effect made Duke bitter at King for embarrassing him in front of his class.

He escapes with Lee and the Mu-Team back to his base. Lee needed an ultra-genius to help him create a working vehicle out of the hard light. To make it work, they needed a special type of crystalline moon rock from the Landmark City Observatory. At the observatory, Duke, Lee and the Mu-Team face off against the Alpha Teens. When Lee gets the moon rock he needed and he was able to form his hard light vehicle, he betrays Duke, because the Mu-Team started to get jealous of his genius.

Lee tries to use his new vehicle to run over Duke, but he uses his telekinesis to throw the vehicle into a pillar. Lee and the Mu-Team escape, but Duke is hit by the pillar and is knocked out cold. Garrett reversed what Lee had done to Duke and the other students and Duke are shown to be unharmed.

Sebastian Manning
Sebastian Manning (voiced by James Arnold Taylor) is the father of Axel Manning and a master of Jo-Lan. He also was a covert ops spy for the government, who worked closely with Alexander Paine and Janus Lee. When Axel recovered his father's diary, he found out that Lee was trading the government's project secrets for tons of money. Then the government reported that someone was giving the secrets to someone else. Sebastian went undercover and caught Lee. Lee told him the truth, saying that it was the owner of the "Serpent's Tail" a.k.a. Master Quan. Paine and Manning went into the nuclear room to fight him, however, Master Quan was equipped with a bomb. The bomb went off, and only Paine escaped alive albeit with his body scarred. Sebastian's body never appeared and he was labeled dead as a result. Quan later reveals that Sebastian Manning is still alive.

Throughout the show, Axel has dreams and memories of his father, most of them involve their Jo-Lan training together. Dragon also shares a connection with Axel's father, being that he knows who he is and knowledgeable and at least one Jo-Lan attack that only Manning knew. Eventually it was revealed that Dragon was actually a clone of Manning. Though many, including Axel and Paine, think that he's dead, there is no real clear answer if he is, or if he's alive.

Michelle Moreno
Michelle Moreno is a news reporter for LIITV news. She first appeared when Outworld Park was being flooded by Paine. Then she appeared talking to Mr. Lee about the transport of Neutronium during a protest. She makes a quick cameo, when Lioness saves a baby from a burning building. She reported on the Anti-Establishment Ultra Challenge Race. She reported on a bank heist that the villains Magness and D-Zel pulled off but Paine got the credit for.

In an episode where she meets the Alpha Teens, she reported on a meteorite that caused a blackout in Landmark City. While she still worked on that story, Hawk got her interested in doing a piece about him testing the Hypersonic Stratojet, with him as leader of the Alpha Teens. When Paine took the meteorite, she tipped off the team to his plan to black out the city again and his location, Angel Peak quarry.

Michelle accompanied the Alpha Teens, telling them that it is the biggest story she ever had. While the others fought and defeated Paine, she stayed with Hawk in the Stratojet. When a brief EMP burst hit the jet, Michelle wanted to eject, but Hawk was determined not to crash it. Unlike the first time the Emp hit, this time Hawk succeeded, pulling the jet out of its nosedive at the last second. Although they did not crash, Hawk's actions left her with the impression that Hawk was a "psychotic weirdo".

Female Doctor
The Female Doctor is a doctor with brunette hair that has made a few appearances in the show. Her real name is unknown. She first appeared as Axel's dentist that shifted her attention to Hawk when he interrupted their session. She then appeared as the doctor for the ski resort on Iron Mountain who was kidnapped and replaced by Magness. She was saved by Lioness and Hawk later in that episode. Her most recent and important appearance was tending to and helping to detox Axel after Paine's men infected him with venom from a very toxic water spider.

A.T.O.M.
Lists of children's television characters
Television characters introduced in 2005